Allene Damian "Ally" Walker (born August 25, 1961) is an American actress. She made her television debut in the NBC daytime soap opera Santa Barbara (1988) before landing the leading roles on the short-lived dramas True Blue (1989–1990), and Moon Over Miami (1993).

During the 1990s, Walker had roles in films such as Universal Soldier (1992), Singles (1992), When the Bough Breaks (1994), While You Were Sleeping (1995), Kazaam (1996), and Happy, Texas (1999). From 1996 to 1999, she played the leading role of Doctor Samantha Waters in the NBC crime drama series Profiler, for which she received Saturn Award for Best Actress on Television nomination. She returned to television with a role in the HBO drama series Tell Me You Love Me (2007), and later played villainous Agent June Stahl in the FX crime drama, Sons of Anarchy (2008–2010). Walker also had the leading role in the short-lived Lifetime police drama series The Protector in 2011. During seasons 4 and 5 (2014 and 2015) of Longmire, she played Dr. Donna Monaghan, a therapist treating veterans who is the title character's love interest.

Early life
Walker was born in Tullahoma, Tennessee, to James Joseph Walker, a physicist, and Louhannah (née Mann) who would become an attorney. She grew up in Santa Fe, New Mexico, where her father worked at the Los Alamos National Laboratory. Originally intending to become a scientist, she attended the University of California, Santa Cruz, where she earned a degree in biochemistry. Subsequently, she worked as a researcher on a genetic engineering project, while preparing for medical school at UCLA. While spending a semester at Richmond College of Arts in London, UK, she discovered an interest in performing. Her professional career began when she was cast in the film Aloha Summer (1988). Her scene was cut from the final version.

Career
In early 1988, Walker joined the cast of NBC daytime soap opera Santa Barbara, playing Andrea Bedford. Later that year, she began appearing on primetime television. During the 1989–90 television season, she played the female lead in the short-lived NBC crime drama series  True Blue. She later guest-starred on Matlock, L.A. Law, and Tales from the Crypt. She starred in the 1991 NBC television movie Perry Mason and the Case of the Fatal Fashion as the devious daughter of Diana Muldaur's character. In 1993, she starred alongside Billy Campbell in the short-lived ABC comedy-drama, Moon Over Miami.

In 1992, Walker played the female leading role opposite Jean-Claude Van Damme in the science-fiction action film Universal Soldier directed by Roland Emmerich. Later that year, she played Sheila Kelley's grouchy roommate in the Cameron Crowe romantic comedy Singles. Her first star-billed role was in the 1994 thriller When the Bough Breaks. In 1995, she had supporting roles in Sandra Bullock's box-office hit While You Were Sleeping, and Andy García's flop Steal Big Steal Little. The following year, Walker co-starred alongside Shaquille O'Neal in the fantasy comedy film, Kazaam.

In 1996, Walker was cast in the leading role as Doctor Samantha Waters in the NBC crime drama series Profiler, a role for which she received a Saturn Award for Best Actress on Television  nomination in 1998, and a Satellite Award for Best Actress – Television Series Drama. In 1996, she was listed as one of Peoples "40 Most Fascinating People on TV." Walker starred as the lead during the first three seasons, but left the show in the fall of 1999. She was replaced by Jamie Luner as a new profiler during the show's final season. Later in 1999, Walker co-starred opposite Steve Zahn in the comedy film Happy, Texas, and played the lead role in the Lifetime television movie, If You Believe.

In 2002, Walker returned to star in and produce the ABC pilot comedy called My Wonderful Life, which was not picked up. In 2005, she released a documentary film For Norman... Wherever You Are as director and producer, which screened at several film festivals. She returned to the New York stage, appearing in a number of Off-Broadway productions. From 2005 to 2010, Walker played many guest roles on television, including Sleeper Cell, ER, The Shield, Boston Legal, Law & Order, CSI: Crime Scene Investigation, Southland, and Law & Order: Special Victims Unit.

In 2007, Walker starred in the HBO drama series about sexual relationships, Tell Me You Love Me. The series was cancelled after a single season. In 2009, she co-starred in films Toe to Toe and Wonderful World opposite Matthew Broderick. From 2008 to 2010, Walker had the recurring role as ATF Agent June Stahl, a major antagonist on the FX crime drama series Sons of Anarchy.

In 2011, Walker played the leading role in the Lifetime police drama series The Protector, which revolves around a single mother who struggles to balance her family and professional life as an LAPD homicide detective. The series was canceled after one season. In 2014, she played Chyler Leigh' lead character's mother in the short-lived NBC police procedural, Taxi Brooklyn. She made her feature scripted film directing and writing debut with Sex, Death and Bowling starring Selma Blair. In 2015, she was cast in the recurring roles in the Netflix crime drama Longmire, and USA Network thriller, Colony.

Personal life
On June 14, 1997, Walker married John Landgraf, then a producer for NBC, at her parents' home in Santa Fe, New Mexico. The couple have three sons. Their names are Walker, Will, and Cal. She has a sister named Elizabeth and a brother named Jim. Finally, her sister also has a grandson named Arlo.

Filmography

Film

Television

References

External links
 
 
 
 

1961 births
20th-century American actresses
21st-century American actresses
Actresses from New Mexico
Actresses from Tennessee
American film actresses
American television actresses
American voice actresses
Living people
Actors from Santa Fe, New Mexico
People from Tullahoma, Tennessee
University of California, Santa Cruz alumni